The Holland Township School District is a community public school district that serves students in pre-kindergarten through eighth grade from Holland Township, in Hunterdon County, New Jersey, United States.

As of the 2018–19 school year, the district, comprising one school, had an enrollment of 530 students and 57.3 classroom teachers (on an FTE basis), for a student–teacher ratio of 9.3:1.

The district is classified by the New Jersey Department of Education as being in District Factor Group "FG", the fourth-highest of eight groupings. District Factor Groups organize districts statewide to allow comparison by common socioeconomic characteristics of the local districts. From lowest socioeconomic status to highest, the categories are A, B, CD, DE, FG, GH, I and J.

Students in public school for ninth through twelfth grades attend Delaware Valley Regional High School, together with students from Alexandria Township, Frenchtown, Kingwood Township and Milford. As of the 2018–19 school year, the high school had an enrollment of 721 students and 68.4 classroom teachers (on an FTE basis), for a student–teacher ratio of 10.5:1.

Awards and recognition
For the 1995-96 school year, Holland Township School was named a "Star School" by the New Jersey Department of Education, the highest honor that a New Jersey school can achieve.

Schools
Schools in the district (with 2018–19 enrollment data from the National Center for Education Statistics) are:
Holland Township Elementary School served 531 students in grades PreK-8
Susan Wardell, Principal

Administration
Core members of the district's administration are:
Stephanie Snyder, Superintendent
M. Brian McCarthy, Business Administrator / Board Secretary

Board of education
The district's board of education, with nine members, sets policy and oversees the fiscal and educational operation of the district through its administration. As a Type II school district, the board's trustees are elected directly by voters to serve three-year terms of office on a staggered basis, with three seats up for election each year held (since 2012) as part of the November general election.

References

External links
Holland Township School District

School Data for the Holland Township School District, National Center for Education Statistics

Holland Township, New Jersey
New Jersey District Factor Group FG
School districts in Hunterdon County, New Jersey
Public K–8 schools in New Jersey